The Scottish Busmen's Union was a trade union representing bus drivers and conductors in Scotland.

The union was in existence by 1929, and was based in Edinburgh.  It merged into the Transport and General Workers' Union in 1934.

See also

 List of trade unions
 TGWU amalgamations

References

Arthur Ivor Marsh, Victoria Ryan. Historical Directory of Trade Unions, Volume 5 Ashgate Publishing, Ltd., Jan 1, 2006 pg. 435

Defunct trade unions of Scotland
Road transport trade unions
Trade unions disestablished in 1934
Transport and General Workers' Union amalgamations